Don't Worry, Be Happy is a compilation album by Bobby McFerrin.

Track listing
All tracks composed by Bobby McFerrin, except where indicated.

"Don't Worry, Be Happy" - 4:51
"Turtle Shoes" (McFerrin, Herbie Hancock) - 3:34
"Another Night in Tunisia" (Dizzy Gillespie, Jon Hendricks, Frank Paparelli) - 4:14
"Even for Me" (McFerrin, Chick Corea) – 6:37
"Mañana Iguana" – 2:23
"Drive" – 3:57
"I Hear Music" (Frank Loesser, Burton Lane) - 3:54
"Walkin'" (Richard Carpenter) - 5:38
"'Round Midnight" (Cootie Williams, Thelonious Monk, Bernie Hanighen) - 7:57

Personnel
Chick Corea – performer on "Even for Me" and "'Round Midnight"
Jon Hendricks – performer on "Another Night in Tunisia"
The Manhattan Transfer – performer on "Another Night in Tunisia"
Bobby McFerrin – percussion, vocals

1988 compilation albums
Bobby McFerrin albums
EMI Records compilation albums